Eduard Steinmann (1894 Vaivara Parish, Virumaa – ?) was an Estonian politician. He was a member of I Riigikogu.

References

1894 births
Members of the Riigikogu, 1920–1923
Year of death missing